The Nardi 750LM Crosley was one of the starters for the 1955 24 Hours of Le Mans motor race during which the 1955 Le Mans disaster occurred. The car was famous for its twin torpedo like body work with the engine in one compartment and driver and fuel tank in the other. Joining these two sides was an upside down wing and this was the cars' downfall as it was blown off the road by a faster car as it was passing.

Racing cars
24 Hours of Le Mans race cars

References